Beverly Gard (born March 8, 1940) is a Republican member of the Indiana Senate, representing the 28th District since 1988 to 2012. She ran for the Greenfield City Council in 1975 for the newly created 5th district and won. She served on the City Council from 1976 to 1988. She was succeeded by Ed Gill on the City Council.

Gard was an elector for George Bush in the 2000 election.

References

External links
Virtual Office of Senator Beverly Gard official Indiana State Legislature site

 

1940 births
Living people
Republican Party Indiana state senators
People from Cherokee County, North Carolina
People from Greenfield, Indiana